The International League Hall of Fame is an American baseball hall of fame which honors players, managers, and executives of the International League (IL). It was created by the International League Baseball Writers' Association in 1947 to honor those individuals who made significant contributions to the league. The Hall of Fame inducted its first class of nine former players, managers, and league officials in 1947. A plaque was unveiled at the IL's New York City offices located in the Ruppert Building at 535 Fifth Avenue. Today, the plaque has no permanent home, but exists as a traveling display which visits a number of the league's ballparks each season.

From 1949 through 1960, the league inducted up to three new members each year. Only one member was inducted annually from 1961 to 1963. After the cessation of the league's Baseball Writers' Association, the Hall of Fame became dormant from 1964 to 2006. The Hall was reestablished in 2007 to commemorate the League's 125th season of play in 2008. Two new members were inducted in 2007, and plans were made to elect up to 28, 14, and 7 inductees, respectively, over the next three years. Since 2011, up to three inductees have been voted into the Hall annually. As of 2020, 129 individuals have been inducted into the International League Hall of Fame.

Table key

Inductees

See also

International League baseball awards
Pacific Coast League Hall of Fame

References

External links
Official website

Hall of Fame
Minor league baseball museums and halls of fame
Awards established in 1947
Dublin, Ohio
Halls of fame in Ohio
Minor league baseball trophies and awards
Minor League Baseball lists